The Tambo River (Spanish: Río Tambo) is a Peruvian river on the eastern slopes of the Andes. It starts at the confluence of the Ene and Perené Rivers at the town of Puerto Prado. From here the Tambo River flows  in an easterly direction and then turns north. When merging with the Urubamba River at the town of Atalaya, it becomes the Ucayali River.

The Tambo is part of the headwaters of the Amazon River whose origin is the Mantaro River at Cordilerra Ruminator Cruz.

Tributaries of the Amazon River
Rivers of Peru
Tributaries of the Ucayali River
Rivers of Junín Region
Rivers of Ucayali Region